María de Salinas, Baroness Willoughby de Eresby (c. 1490 – 1539) was an English noblewoman and courtier from Spain. She was a confidante and lady-in-waiting to Catherine of Aragon, Queen of England.

Family background
María was the daughter of Martín de Salinas (d. 1503), and Josefa González de Salas, who were members of the royal household in Castile, and probably related to the royal family. She had a younger sister, Ines, born in 1491, who died sometime after she did.

As a lady-in-waiting
The exact date that María became a maid-of-honour to Catherine of Aragon is unknown, but is thought to have been in 1501. María remained unmarried until 5 June 1516, when she married the English nobleman William Willoughby, 11th Baron Willoughby de Eresby, and they had one child, Catherine, who succeeded to her father's barony Grimsthorpe Castle was granted by King Henry VIII to the de Eresby family on the occasion of María's marriage. Henry esteemed María so much that in 1522 he named a ship HMS Mary Willoughby in her honour.

In 1511 María became the godmother to Mary Brandon, the daughter of Charles Brandon, 1st Duke of Suffolk and his second wife Anne Browne. Lord Willoughby died in 1526; the Duke of Suffolk made María's daughter, Catherine, his ward shortly thereafter, marrying her as his fourth wife in 1533. María spent several years fighting her brother-in-law, Sir Christopher Willoughby, for control of the Willoughby estates on behalf of her daughter.

The death of Catherine of Aragon
María was a devoted friend to Catherine of Aragon. In August 1532, shortly before Catherine's marriage to Henry was annulled, she was ordered to leave Catherine's household and not to make any attempt to communicate with her. In September 1534, when Catherine's health deteriorated, María begged permission to visit her but was denied. On 5 January 1536 she forced her way into Kimbolton Castle to see Catherine, having again been refused permission to visit. Catherine died in her arms two days later.

María lived for another three years, spending much of the time in her London residence at Barbican. Her daughter Catherine Willoughby, Duchess of Suffolk, became a close friend of Henry VIII's sixth wife, Catherine Parr, who was also the goddaughter of Catherine of Aragon. In 1546, there were rumours that Henry was planning to have his marriage to Catherine Parr annulled and make the widowed Duchess his seventh wife.

Cultural depictions

María is the main character in All Manner of Things—the second novel of Wendy J. Dunn's Falling Pomegranate Seeds duology. 978-0648715221

María is depicted as the drummer of the band in the musical Six, along with three other ladies in waiting of the other queens.

She was portrayed by the actress Margaret Ford in the 1970 BBC series The Six Wives of Henry VIII.

References

1490s births
1539 deaths
Spanish untitled nobility
English ladies-in-waiting
16th-century Spanish women
16th-century Spanish people
16th-century English women
Maria
Spanish emigrants to the Kingdom of England
Household of Catherine of Aragon